Pristimantis siopelus is a species of frog in the family Strabomantidae.
It is found in Colombia and possibly Ecuador.
Its natural habitat is tropical moist montane forests.
It is threatened by habitat loss.

References

siopelus
Endemic fauna of Colombia
Amphibians of Colombia
Amphibians described in 1990
Taxonomy articles created by Polbot